Crocomela flammifera is a moth of the subfamily Arctiinae first described by William Warren in 1904. It is found in Peru.

It is involved in Müllerian mimicry with Lyces vulturata.

References

Moths described in 1904
Arctiinae